John Kosh, known simply as Kosh, is an English art director, album cover designer, graphic artist, and documentary producer/director. He was born in London, England and rose to prominence in the mid-1960s while designing for the Royal Ballet and the Royal Opera House. He was the creative director of the Beatles' 1969 album Abbey Road.

History
As art director of Art & Artists Magazine, he met the Beatles towards the end of the 1960s and was hired as Creative Director for Apple Records, where he was responsible for design, promotion and publicity. During this period he designed albums for a clientele that covered numerous British rock bands including the Rolling Stones. In 1969 Kosh handled the War Is Over campaign for John Lennon and Yoko Ono and created the famous Abbey Road and Who's Next album covers. During this period Kosh became well known in the London avant-garde art scene for designing and producing exhibitions, posters and books.

In 1973 after garnering several awards with the London Design & Art Directors Club, he was elected to the British D&AD Jury before moving to Los Angeles. Once in L.A. he continued designing for various famous artists including: Jon Lord, Jimmy Buffett, Bob Dylan, the Eagles, The Moody Blues, Dan Fogelberg, Carole King, Randy Newman, Pointer Sisters, T.Rex, Richard Pryor, Ringo Starr, Linda Ronstadt, Electric Light Orchestra, Bob Seger, Rod Stewart, Spinal Tap, W.A.S.P. and James Taylor. Kosh has garnered seven Grammy nominations and won three for his work with Linda Ronstadt. He is the only Art Director to have worked with The Beatles, The Rolling Stones and The Who. 

He served as faculty member of Otis/Parsons Institute of Art and on the Board of Governors of the National Recording Academy. From approximately 1988–1993, Kosh was partner in the Los Angeles Design Studio, Kosh Brooks Design, with fellow Art Director Larry Brooks. Kosh's client roster has included Capitol Records, Columbia-TriStar, Walt Disney Studios, Walt Disney Classics, Fox Television, The Gurin Company, CNN, MCA, MGM, the NFL (he designed the Super Bowl XXI logo), Sony Records and Warner Bros. Records. In 2009, the British Post Office (Royal Mail) issued commemorative stamps recognising the Beatles and their album covers. Two of them were Kosh's: Abbey Road and Let It Be.

Personal life
John Kosh currently lives and works in Los Angeles and has one child, John Kosh Jr. (born in London 24 May 1971) who currently lives in Pullman, Washington.

Works
A display of his more prominent graphics was exhibited at the Rock & Roll Hall of Fame Museum in Cleveland, Ohio.

10,000 Maniacs
1987 "In My Tribe"
Aerosmith
1978 "Live! Bootleg"
1979 "Night in the Ruts"
Bad Company
1976 "Run with the Pack"
Badfinger
1974 "Badfinger"
The Beatles
1969 "Abbey Road"
1969 "The Ballad of John and Yoko" single 
1970 "Let It Be"
Jimmy Buffett
1977 "Son of a Son of a Sailor"
1989 "Off to See the Lizard"
2002 "Far Side of the World"
2003 "Meet Me in Margaritaville: The Ultimate Collection"
2005 "Live at Fenway Park"
2007 "Live at Wrigley Field"
2009 "Buffet Hotel"
2010 "encores"
J. J. Cale
1979 "5"
Kim Carnes
1982 "Voyeur"
Donovan
1973 Cosmic Wheels
1973 "Essence to Essence"
Eagles
1976 "Hotel California"
No. 6 on Rolling Stone'''s 100 Best Album Covers of All Time
1979 "The Long Run"
1980 "Eagles Live"
1982 "Eagles Greatest Hits, Vol. 2"
Electric Light Orchestra
Designed the band's logo and these album covers
1976 "A New World Record"
1977 "Out of the Blue"
Family 
1971 "Fearless"
Dan Fogelberg
1977 "Nether Lands"
1978 "Twin Sons of Different Mothers"
1979 "Phoenix"
1980 "The Innocent Age"
1984 "Windows and Walls"
1990 "The Wild Places"
1993 "River of Souls"
1995 "No Resemblance Whatsoever"
Marvin Gaye
1978 "Here, My Dear"
Humble Pie
1972 "Smokin'"
1973 "Eat It"
King Crimson
1974 "Red"
John Lennon & Yoko Ono
1968 "Life With the Lions"
1969 "Wedding Album"
1969 "Cold Turkey" single 
1969 'War is Over (If You Want It)' campaign and Christmas card 
1969 Plastic Ono Band "Give Peace a Chance" single 
John Lennon
1970 "Instant Karma!" single
1971 " Power to the People" single 
Jon Lord
1976 SarabandeLinda Lewis
1972 "Lark"
Carole King
1989 "City Streets"
1993 "Colour of Your Dreams"
McGuinness Flint
1972 "McGuinness Flint"
Kronos Quartet
1988 "Winter Was Hard"
Melissa Manchester
1977 "Singin'"
1978 "Don't Cry Out Loud"
Steve Miller Band
1986 "Living in the 20th Century"
Martin Mull
1978 "Sex and Violins"
Randy Newman
1988 "Land of Dreams"
1995 "Randy Newman's Faust"
Tom Petty and the Heartbreakers
1978 "You're Gonna Get It!"
Pointer Sisters
1981 "Black & White"
1982 "So Excited!"
Richard Pryor
1976 "Bicentennial Nigger"
Bonnie Raitt
1979 "The Glow"
Ratt
1991 "Ratt & Roll 81-91"
REO Speedwagon
1980 "Hi Infidelity"
1982 "Good Trouble"
Minnie Riperton
1977 "Stay in Love"
Rolling Stones
1970 "Get Yer Ya-Ya's Out!"
1971 "Through the Past, Darkly (Big Hits Vol. 2)"
Linda Ronstadt
1975 "Prisoner in Disguise"
1976 "Hasten Down the Wind"
1976 "Greatest Hits"
1977 "Simple Dreams" – GRAMMY
1977 "A Retrospective"
1978 "Living in the USA"
1980 "Mad Love"
1981 "Greatest Hits, Volume 2"
1982 "Get Closer"
GRAMMY; design & A/D w/Ron Larson
1983 "What's New"
1984 "Lush Life"
GRAMMY; design & A/D w/Ron Larson
1986 "For Sentimental Reasons"
1987 "Trio" (with Dolly Parton & Emmylou Harris)
Design & A/D w/Ron Larson
1987 "Canciones de Mi Padre"
1991 "Mas Canciones"
1992 "Frenesi"
1993 “Winter Light ”
1996 "Dedicated to the One I Love"
1998 “We Ran”
1999 “Box set Compilation”
2000 “A Merry Little Christmas”
2013 “Simple Dreams A Musical Memoir]]”
Phil Spector
1972 "A Christmas Gift for You"
Ringo Starr
1970 "Beaucoups of Blues"
1976 "Ringo's Rotogravure"
1977 "Ringo the 4th"
1978 "Bad Boy"
1981 "Stop and Smell the Roses"
Rod Stewart
1975 "Atlantic Crossing"
1976 "A Night on the Town"
1977 "Foot Loose & Fancy Free"
1983 "Body Wishes"
Spinal Tap
1992 "Break Like the Wind"
Design & A/D with Larry Brooks
Stone the Crows
1972 "Ontinuous Performance" 
T. Rex (Marc Bolan)
1973 "Tanx"
1974 "Zinc Alloy and the Hidden Riders of Tomorrow"
1975 "Bolan's Zip Gun"
Andy Taylor
1987 "Thunder"
James Taylor
1976 "Greatest Hits"
1977 "JT"
1979 "Flag"
1981 "Dad Loves His Work"
Koko Taylor
1991 "I Got What It Takes"
W.A.S.P.
1989 "The Headless Children"
1992 "The Crimson Idol"
1997 "KFD"
1999 "Helldorado"
2001 "Unholy Terror"
2002 "Dying For The World"
2004 "The Neon God: Part 1 - The Rise"
2004 "The Neon God: Part 2 - The Demise"
The Who
1971 "Who's Next"
The Moody Blues
1978 "Octave"

Awards
Kosh is a seven-time Grammy nominee, and has won three of the awards:
Grammy Awards of 1986 – John Kosh & Ron Larson (art directors) "Best Album Package 1984" for Lush Life performed by Linda Ronstadt
Grammy Awards of 1983 – John Kosh & Ron Larson (art directors) "Best Album Package 1982" for Get Closer performed by Linda Ronstadt
Grammy Awards of 1978 – John Kosh (art director) "Best Album Package 1977" for Simple Dreams'' performed by Linda Ronstadt

Journey to the Ten Worlds
In 1995 Kosh and actor Susan Shearer formed Ten Worlds Entertainment. They directed the opening and closing sequences for the Emmy winning documentaries "When The Lion Roars—The MGM Story" and "In Search of Dr. Seuss" for Turner along with the 1992 through 1998 Billboard Awards telecasts for Fox TV. As production designers on the Showtime six-hour documentary, "Sex and the Silver Screen" with Raquel Welch, Kosh and Shearer recreated the look, lighting and film techniques of the 1960s back through the 1920s and teens. Ten Worlds was responsible for the title, set and production design for the CBS special "60 Years of Life Magazine" hosted by Candice Bergen. Ten Worlds also produced the elegant show logos and graphics for a series of TCM documentaries on glamorous film stars such as Louise Brooks, Rita Hayworth and Clara Bow. They designed the Warner Bros. 75th Anniversary Show, "Glorious Technicolor", hosted by Angela Lansbury, for TNT and the New Year's special, "Life Remembers for CBS". Ten Worlds achieved critical acclaim for their work on "The Last Days of Kennedy and King" for TBS and the ten-hour documentary "100 Years −100 Movies" for the America Film Institute and CBS. The Ten Worlds team designed "California Connected", a dynamic, weekly news program for PBS stations throughout California and "The Barrymores", a 90-minute special for A&E along with "Masters of Production" for PBS, chronicling the great Hollywood movie production designers.

In 2005, Kosh led Ten Worlds Entertainment into its evolution – becoming Ten Worlds Productions, Inc. Under its new name, it produced and directed a pilot for The History Channel, "Declassified: The Rise and Fall of the Wall", which sheds new light on the Berlin Wall. This pilot soon became a 13-part documentary series. The subjects of these documentaries focus on such figures as John Lennon, Fidel Castro, the Tet Offensive, Charles Lindbergh, Joseph Stalin and World War I.

Kosh and Ten Worlds Productions, Inc. are presently developing a rock doc feature on Apple Records and 2 animated series; one with comedian Lewis Black, and the other with Tea and Cheese from the UK.

References

External links

koshdesign
The Seventies website
Beatles fan site
Rolling Stones
Grammy List
Ringo Discography
John Lennon Fan site

Apple Records
English art directors
English designers
English film producers
Film directors from London
Year of birth missing (living people)
Living people
Grammy Award winners
Album-cover and concert-poster artists
English expatriates in the United States